Lyantonde General Hospital, also Lyantonde District Hospital or Lyantonde Government Hospital, is a hospital in the Central Region of Uganda.

Location
The coordinates of Lyantonde General Hospital are 0°23'56.0"S, 31°09'13.0"E (Latitude:-0.398889; Longitude:31.153611).

Overview
Before 2011, Lyantonde General Hospital was a Health Centre IV. In 2011, the health center was elevated to a full hospital. Lyantonde General Hospital is on the list of general hospitals earmarked for renovation and expansion.

See also
List of hospitals in Uganda

References

External links 
 Website of Uganda Ministry of Health
 Hospitals get facelift, but far from better service delivery
  Maternal Deaths in Lwengo and Lyantonde Districts

Lyantonde
Lyantonde District
Central Region, Uganda
Hospitals established in 2011
2011 establishments in Uganda